Aprey is a commune in the Haute-Marne department in the Grand Est region in northeastern France.

The commune is famous for its faience. Aprey Faience was produced at a glass-works at Aprey, set up in 1744 by Jacques Lallemont de Villehaut, Baron d'Aprey. The factory closed in 1885.

Population

See also
Communes of the Haute-Marne department

References

Communes of Haute-Marne